Henry Thomas Lane (29 December 1873 – 22 March 1955) was an Australian politician. He was born in Deloraine, Tasmania. In 1926 he was elected to the Tasmanian House of Assembly as a Labor member for Darwin, serving until he was defeated in 1928. He returned to the House in 1937 but was defeated again in 1946. Lane died in Devonport.

References

1873 births
1955 deaths
Members of the Tasmanian House of Assembly
Australian Labor Party members of the Parliament of Tasmania